Myung-yong is a Korean masculine given name. Its meaning differs based on the hanja used to write each syllable of the name. There are 19 hanja with the reading "myung" and 24 hanja with the reading "yong" on the South Korean government's official list of hanja which may be registered for use in given names. Additionally, there is one hanja with the reading "ryong" (meaning "dragon") which may also be written and pronounced "yong" in South Korea.

People with this name include:
Yi Myeong-ryong (이명룡, 1873–1956), Korean independence activist, recipient of the Order of Merit for National Foundation
Choi Myung-yong (born 1976), South Korean football referee
Yeo Myung-yong (born 1987), South Korean footballer

See also
List of Korean given names

References

Korean masculine given names